(13E)-labda-7,13-dien-15-ol synthase (EC 3.1.7.10, labda-7,13E-dien-15-ol synthase) is an enzyme with systematic name geranylgeranyl-diphosphate diphosphohydrolase [(13E)-labda-7,13-dien-15-ol-forming]. It catalyses the reaction

 geranylgeranyl diphosphate + H2O  (13E)-labda-7,13-dien-15-ol + diphosphate

The enzyme from the lycophyte Selaginella moellendorffii is bifunctional

References

External links 
 

EC 3.1.7